Jana Witthedová (born 28 June 1948) is a Czech writer living in Sweden.

She was born in Zlín and grew up in Prague. In 1971, she was given political asylum in Sweden and earned a degree in psychology from Lund University. Unlike many Czech asylum seekers, Witthedová retained her Czech citizenship.

She contributes to both Czech and Swedish newspapers and journals, including Obrys, Literární noviny, Telegraf, Tvar, Severské listy, Český dialog and Artes. She has published several collections of her poetry and her writing has also been included in various anthologies. Her work has been translated into Swedish, Norwegian and English.

Selected works 
 Trosečníci křišťálové země (1997)
 Zastavení v hloubce času (2007)
 Kristallandets skeppsbrutna (2009)
 Litiluisté nosí železnou korunu a navštěvují krále (2011)

References 

1948 births
Living people
20th-century Czech women writers
21st-century Czech women writers
Czech journalists
Czech women journalists
Swedish women journalists
Lund University alumni
Czech emigrants to Sweden
Writers from Zlín
20th-century Swedish women